Hernandez James "Hunkie" Cooper (born May 17, 1969) is a former American football Wide receiver and linebacker who played for the Arizona Rattlers of the Arena Football League until his retirement in 2005. He was previously the wide receivers coach for the San Diego State Aztecs football team and currently is the Director of Football Player Development for the UNLV Rebels football team. He is a two time recipient of the Ironman of the Year award and was voted league MVP in 1993.

Early life
Hunkie Cooper was the son of a military veteran and the youngest, and shortest, of 9 children. He received the name Hernandez from a pact his father had made to his best friend prior to the Vietnam War. The pact they made said that if either were to die, the other would name his next child after him.

High school years
Cooper attended Westwood High School in Palestine, Texas and was a student and a letterman in football, basketball, and baseball. In football, he played quarterback.

College years
Hunkie went on to play at Navarro College in Texas where he led the Bulldogs to a NJCAA national championship in 1989. He soon transferred to University of Nevada, Las Vegas. At UNLV, he played six different positions, and he was a two-time All-Big West Conference selection. In a dramatic beginning to D1 Football in Hunkie's first game for Head Coach Jim Strong's UNLV Rebel's he scored Four Touchdowns from all over the field in the season opener verses Southwest Missouri. As a punt returner during his senior season he was selected as an All-American. He received a B.A. in Criminal Law and Education in 1991.

Professional career

Arizona Rattlers
After his time at UNLV, Hunkie believed his football career was over, so he took a job at a Las Vegas area casino. He tried playing in the Canadian Football League, but was not very successful. One day at work, Arizona Rattlers Director of Player Personnel Pete Kettela asked him if he would like to sign a contract with the Rattlers organization.

1993–1997
Cooper arrived at camp as a fourth string receiver but quickly worked his way up the depth chart. By the end of the year he was selected as the league MVP, and an all-star as an Offensive Specialist while breaking the AFL record for kickoff return yards with 1423 yards.

In 1994, Cooper helped take the team to their first ArenaBowl appearance, which they won 36–31.

In 1996, a year after making the transition to a two way receiver and linebacker, he was selected as an all star once again.

In 1997, Cooper was a second-team all star selection. He helped lead the team to their second ArenaBowl win and was voted as Ironman of the game after catching a 30-yard touchdown pass, returning a kick for a touchdown, and returning an interception for a touchdown.

1998–2001
He was voted Tinactin Ironman of the Year, Second-team All-Arena - WR/LB, and All-Ironman Team in 1999. He was again voted Tinactin Ironman of the Year, First-team All-Arena - WR/LB, and All-Ironman Team - WR/LB, in 2000.

In 2001, he was again selected to the All-Ironman Team - WR/LB and for the first time was a First-team member of the 15th Anniversary Team - WR/LB.

2002–2005
On March 20, 2002, Cooper re-signed with the Rattlers. He helped lead the team to three consecutive appearances in the ArenaBowl.

Cooper began the 2005 season on Injured Reserve, missing the first two games of the season with a quadriceps injury. He soon retired after being cut.

Retirement
After being cut by the Rattlers in 2005, he decided to retire. On May 6, 2005, the Arizona Rattlers retired his #14. Cooper was elected into the Arena Football Hall of Fame in the 2011 class.

Stats
Cooper is one of only two players to earn both AFL MVP (1993) and Ironman of the Year awards (1999, 2000) in a career. He is also one of two players to earn Ironman awards twice. He finished his career as Arizona's all-time leader in receiving yards (8,559), receptions (776), forced fumbles (7), fumble recoveries (11) and touchdowns (205). Cooper is also the Arena Football League's all-time leader in all-purpose yardage (20,587) and kickoff returns (500).

Coaching career

Utah Blaze

2006 season
He later became a wide receivers/linebackers coach for the Utah Blaze under his former coach Danny White.

2007 season
In 2007, Cooper was the defensive coordinator for the Blaze.

2008 season
In 2008, Cooper was demoted to defensive backs coach under new Blaze head coach Ron James. After the Blaze started the season 0–5, Cooper was relieved of his coaching duties.

High school coaching
While coaching with the Utah Blaze, Hunkie also served as an assistant coach with Canyon Springs High School in Las Vegas. In 2009 Hunkie was named the head coach at Canyon Springs High School and was also named Coach of the Year.
He also served as an assistant coach at Bishop Gorman High School in Las Vegas.

San Diego State
In January 2015, Cooper was hired as the wide receivers coach at San Diego State University. Cooper was dismissed from his position at San Diego State in January 2023.

UNLV
On March 1, 2023, UNLV announced the hiring of Cooper as its Director of Football Player Development.

Personal
Cooper resides in North Las Vegas, Nevada. Hunkie is married to his wife, Tiffany and has six children: Nigel (23), Dirik (22), Simone (21), Brianna (15), A.J. (14), and Destini (11).

References

1969 births
Living people
American football linebackers
American football wide receivers
American players of Canadian football
Canadian football wide receivers
Arizona Rattlers players
BC Lions players
Navarro Bulldogs football players
New Orleans Saints players
San Diego State Aztecs football coaches
UNLV Rebels football players
Utah Blaze coaches
High school football coaches in Nevada
People from North Las Vegas, Nevada
People from Palestine, Texas
Players of American football from Texas